Itch is the sixth album from Canadian singer and guitarist Kim Mitchell. The album was released in 1994. This would be the last album to date that Mitchell would collaborate with lyricist Pye Dubois. Dubois didn't contribute any lyrics to Mitchell's previous album Aural Fixations, released two years before this album.

Track listing
All songs by Kim Mitchell, Pye Dubois, except "Karaoke Queen" by Mitchell, Dubois and Lou Pomanti
 "Wonder Where and Why" – 3:46
 "Acrimony" – 3:35
 "Lick Yer Finger" – 4:01
 "The U.S. of Ache" – 5:38
 "Lemon Wedge" – 5:33
 "Heartbreakbustop" – 4:57
 "Your Face or Mine" – 4:41
 "Human Condition" – 5:16
 "Stand" – 4:31
 "Karaoke Queen" – 4:22
 "Cheer Us On" – 4:27
 "Beachtown" – 4:49 (European version bonus track)

Personnel
Musicians
Kim Mitchell – guitar, vocals, arrangements
Spider Sinnaeve – bass
Greg Morrow – drums and percussion
Lou Pomanti – keyboards
Peter Fredette, William C. Brown III, Bertram Brown – background vocals
Scott Thompson – trumpet
Jim Spake – saxophone
Pye Dubois – lyrics

Production
Joe Hardy – producer, engineer, mixing, arrangements
Todd Booth – arrangements
Tom Heron, Jeff Elliott, Erik Flettrich – assistant engineers
Scott Murley – digital sequencing and editing
George Marino – mastering at Sterling Sound, New York
W. Tom Berry – executive producer, management

References

External links
http://www.kimmitchell.ca

1994 albums
Kim Mitchell albums
Alert Records albums